Neha Joshi (born 7 December 1986) is an Indian actress.

Her work includes Zenda (2010) and Poshter Boyz (2014). Joshi plays B. R. Ambedkar's mother Bhimabai in the Ek Mahanayak - Dr.B.R. Ambedkar series on & TV. hawaa hawaai movie

Early life

During her college days she actively participated in inter-collegiate drama competitions. She started her acting career from the commercial Marathi Stage Drama Kshan Ek Pure and Television career from the Marathi serial Oon Paus in 2000.

Personal life 
She married writer Omakar Kulkarni on  16th August 2022

Career

She acted in various Marathi films, commercial dramas and Marathi television serials. She also acted in some Hindi films. Her role in the Marathi film Poshter Boyz, directed by Sameer Patil received critics appreciation. In 2016, she also produced the Marathi short film Ukali.She also worked i marathi serial naming 'Ka Re Durava' as "rajani" character.

Filmography

Films

Television

References

External links

Neha Joshi on 
Neha Joshi on 
Neha Joshi on 

1986 births
Living people
Marathi actors
People from Pune
Actresses in Marathi cinema
Actresses in Hindi cinema
Actresses in Marathi television
Indian television actresses
Indian film actresses
20th-century Indian actresses
21st-century Indian actresses
Indian stage actresses
Actresses in Marathi theatre